Alex Hay (10 May 1933 – 11 July 2011) was a Scottish professional golfer, golf instructor, writer and a former BBC sports commentator. Hay was best known for his commentating partnership with Peter Alliss where their banter, often displaying humour or wit became regarded by many as the "Voice of Golf". He was a former Ryder Cup referee.

Hay was born in Edinburgh. He was educated at Musselburgh Grammar School. He joined Ben Sayers as an apprentice golf club maker before becoming assistant to Bill Shankland at Potters Bar. He was the professional at East Herts and Dunham Forest. For 12 years, he was the professional at Ashridge Golf Club between 1964 and 1976. In 1977 he became professional and then the managing director of the Woburn Golf Club in England. He was a professional golfer until 1994 and commentated for the BBC between 1978 and 2004. He co-presented all the major golf tournaments with fellow commentator Peter Alliss during this period and Hay and Alliss were renowned for their great rapport and charisma on television, and enduring friendship outside of the commentary. Hay also provided commentary with Alliss in the Actua Golf video game series, capturing the charm of their television commentary.

Although Hay retired from broadcasting, he remained involved in the professional golf scene. He was noted for his golfing instruction, particularly the techniques of the swing. He wrote numerous works on the subject. His son David, also a golfer, is proprietor of the Galloway's Restaurant in Woburn.

Hay died on 11 July 2011, following a short illness. He was aged 78.

References

External links
Obituary of Alex Hay, The Daily Telegraph, 12 July 2011

Scottish male golfers
BBC sports presenters and reporters
Golf writers and broadcasters
Scottish sports broadcasters
Golfers from Edinburgh
People educated at Musselburgh Grammar School
1933 births
2011 deaths